Trilogy is the sixth studio album by German artist ATB, released in Europe on 27 April 2007 and in the U.S. on 22 May 2007.

This album was made with a similar concept as ATB's second album, Two Worlds (2000), which is a two-disc album based upon different types of music for different moods. The first CD featured mainly up-tempo songs, while the second CD provided ambient and down-tempo songs.

The normal version of Trilogy includes only the first disc, which has a feel similar to that of ATB's older albums though with a slightly more rock/pop-oriented sound than his previous efforts, while the second disc, included only in the limited version, has a much more ambient feel, similar to some other trance music artists.

Track listing

Charts and certifications

Charts

Certifications

References

External links 
ATB's website
ATB's official Facebook page
Official ATB YouTube channel

2007 albums
ATB albums